Glarichelys is an extinct genus of sea turtle which was originally considered to be from the middle Oligocene epoch but has more recently come to be considered from the Eocene epoch. It was first named by Zangerl in 1958.

References

External links
 Glarichelys at the Paleobiology Database

Eocene turtles
Cheloniidae
Fossils of Germany
Prehistoric turtle genera
Extinct turtles
Monotypic prehistoric reptile genera
Fur Formation